Birds described in 1867 include short-tailed finch, Mascarene coot (subfossil, Tongatapu rail (known only from brief descriptions of a specimen, now lost and a painting) Drakensberg rockjumper, Darwin's nothura, yellow-shouldered grosbeak, helmeted honeyeater, rufous scrubbird, 
Death of Prince Maximilian of Wied-Neuwied
Death of  Prideaux John Selby
Death of  John MacGillivray
Death of Filippo de Filippi
Alphonse Milne-Edwards  Recherches anatomiques et paléontologiques pour servir à l'histoire des oiseaux fossiles de la France.1867-71 Online at Gallica Bibliothèque nationale de France
Foundation of Museo Civico di Storia Naturale di Genova

Expeditions
1865–1868 Magenta circumnavigation of the globe  Italian expedition that made important scientific observations in South America. 
Ongoing events
John Gould The birds of Australia; Supplement 1851–69. 1 vol. 81 plates; Artists: J. Gould and H. C. Richter; Lithographer: H. C. Richter
John Gould The birds of Asia; 1850-83 7 vols. 530 plates, Artists: J. Gould, H. C. Richter, W. Hart and J. Wolf; Lithographers:H. C. Richter and W. Hart
The Ibis

References

Bird
Birding and ornithology by year